Scott Jenkins is a Welsh male ultra runner, motivational speaker and philanthropist. He finished 15th out of the 168 finishers at the 2021 Moab 240 Endurance Run in Moab, Utah. Jenkins's finish was the fastest on record for a British finisher (3 days, 5 hours, 2 minutes). Jenkins ran the race in 2019 as well (though it took 19 hours longer).

He is the first Welshman to complete the Moab 240, Cocodona 250 (finishing 36/239), and Bigfoot 200 (finishing 25/205) and second Welshman ever to complete the invite only event Badwater 135 (second to his brother, Rhys Jenkins whom he also crewed for). Runners must qualify and apply to compete at Badwater, and only 100 runners are invited each year. He is also an ambassador for the global charity Operation Smile.

Career 
Jenkins started his ultrarunning career in 2010 with a 2000 mile run from Boston to Austin for charity, running 75 marathons in 75 days. for charities British Heart Foundation, Help for Heroes and Young Texans against Cancer.

In 2013, he was part of a 4 man team who cycled from Seattle to Jacksonville, 4000 miles non-stop for the Royal Marines Foundation in memory of a close friend.

In 2016, he ran across Iceland in 5 days and in 2019 alongside completing Moab 240, Jenkins finished 6th in the UK’s Canal Slam (a series of 3 races, 130, 145 and 145 miles over 4 months along the UK canal system).

References 

Living people
British ultramarathon runners
Male ultramarathon runners
Welsh male long-distance runners
Sportspeople from Cardiff
1980 births
Running
Ultrarunning